The discography of the Used, an American rock band, consists of eight studio albums, two live albums, one compilation album, three extended plays, one demo, three video albums, twenty singles and twenty-seven music videos. After releasing their eponymous debut album in 2002, The Used become one of the leaders of their era and have enjoyed much success with many of their albums being certified gold and platinum by the RIAA and selling over 10 million albums combined worldwide.

Albums

Studio albums

Live albums

Compilation albums

Video albums

Demos

Extended plays

Singles 

Notes

Other songs 
This is a list of non-album tracks by The Used.

B-sides 
This is a list of b-sides from The Used studio albums.

Music videos

References

Discographies of American artists
Post-hardcore group discographies